Wapsie Valley High School (WVHS) is a public high school in northeastern Iowa, part of the Wapsie Valley Community School District. It is located equidistantly between Readlyn and Fairbank. It combines both junior and senior high school.

Athletics 
The Warriors compete in the North Iowa Cedar League Conference.

Boys

Baseball, Basketball, Cross Country, Football, Golf, Track and Field, Wrestling

Girls

Basketball, Cross Country, Golf, Softball, Track and Field, Volleyball

Football
Class 2A state champions in 1986 and 1987
Class 1A state champions in 1997
Class A state champions in 2007 and 2012

Boys Basketball
Class 1A state champions in 2020

Boys Cross Country
Class 1A state champs in 2000, 2004, and 2005

Volleyball
Class 1A state champions in 2006 and 2007

Extra 
Claimed the first ever Class 1A Traveling Challenge Cup for their athletic and academic achievements during the 2007–08 school year.
Wapsie Valley was the first of two football teams in the state of Iowa to claim championships in 3 separate classes: A, 1A, and 2A.

Notable alumni

 Chris Jans — collegiate basketball coach

See also
List of high schools in Iowa

References

External links 
 Wapsie Valley Community School District - High School

Public high schools in Iowa
Schools in Buchanan County, Iowa